Gulrukhbegim Tokhirjonova (born 16 July 1999) is an Uzbek-born American chess player and Woman Grandmaster (2016).

Biography
In 2011, Gulrukhbegim Tokhirjonova, who goes by Begim, won the bronze medal at the World Youth Chess Championship in age category U12. In 2015, she won the Asian Girls Championship in age category U20. In 2017, she is second Asian Zone 3.4 after Dinara Saduakassova and qualified for the Women's World Chess Championship 2018. In 2018, Gulrukhbegim Tokhirjonova won the Uzbekistan Women Chess Championship.

In 2015, she was awarded the FIDE Woman International Master (WIM) title and received the FIDE Woman Grandmaster (WGM) title a year later. Tokhirjonova played for Uzbekistan in the Women's Chess Olympiads:
 In 2016, at second board in the 42nd Chess Olympiad (women) in Baku (+2, =3, -3), 
 In 2018, at first board in the 43rd Chess Olympiad (women) in Batumi (+7, =3, -1).

In the fall of 2019, Tokhirjonova began attending the University of Missouri, where she joined the chess team and studies business with an emphasis in marketing.

Tokhirjonova took silver at the virtual 2020 U.S. Online Collegiate Rapid and Blitz Championships in the women's section; in October 2021, she took the second place at the 2021 U.S. Women's Championship, following Carissa Yip.

In May 2022, she won fourth place at the first American Cup, a double elimination format, after she was eliminated by Irina Krush in the Champion's Bracket, then Tatev Abrahamyan in the Elimination Bracket.
Tokhirjonova was a member of the U.S. Women's Olympiad Chess Team for 2022; the U.S. team placed fourth at the 44th Chess Olympiad.

References

External links

1999 births
Living people
Uzbekistani chess players
Chess woman grandmasters
Chess Olympiad competitors